IAL may refer to:

Intel Architecture Labs, a research arm of Intel Corporation during the 1990s
International Advanced Levels, an academic qualification offered by Edexcel
International Algebraic Language or ALGOL 58
International Artists' Lodge, trade union in Germany
International auxiliary language, a language for communication between people who do not share a native language
Institute for Adult Learning, an autonomous institute based in Singapore.
Iâl or Ial or Yale, a commote in Medieval Wales.